The Ambassador from New Zealand to Thailand is New Zealand's foremost diplomatic representative in the Kingdom of Thailand, and in charge of New Zealand's diplomatic mission in Thailand.

The embassy is located in Bangkok, Thailand's capital city.  New Zealand has maintained a resident ambassador in Thailand since 1961, and a resident Head of Mission since 1958.  The Ambassador to Thailand is concurrently accredited to Cambodia, and Laos.

List of heads of mission

Non-resident ambassador to Thailand
 Foss Shanahan (1956–1958) (resident in Singapore)

Chargé d'Affaires in Thailand
 Charles Craw (1958–1961)

Ambassadors to Thailand
 Sir Stephen Weir (1961–1968)
 Ian Stewart (1968–1970)
 Eric Halstead (1970–1973)
 Paul Edmonds (1973–1975)
 Richard Taylor (1975–1981)
 Ray Jermyn (1981–1985)
 Bruce Brown (1985–1988)
 Harle Freeman-Greene (1988–1992)
 Phillip Gibson (1992–1996)
 Adrian Macey (1996–2000)
 Alan Williams (2000–2003)
 Peter Rider (2003–2006)
 Brook Barrington (2006 - 2009)
 Bede Corry (2009 - 2012)
 Tony Lynch (2012 -2016)
 Ben King (2016-2017)
 Peter Rider (Charge d’Affaires 2017-2018)
 Taha Macpherson (2018-2021)
 Mary Thurston (Charge d’Affaires) 
 Jonathan Kings (2022-Present)

References
 New Zealand Heads of Overseas Missions: Thailand.  New Zealand Ministry of Foreign Affairs and Trade.  Retrieved on 2008-03-29.

Thailand, Ambassadors from New Zealand to
New Zealand